Rahkan may refer to:
 Rahkan, Jahrom
 Rahkan, Qir and Karzin